The Holy Trinity Serbian Orthodox Church is a Serbian Orthodox Church in Westmount, a suburb of Montreal, Quebec. The church is a parish of the Serbian Orthodox Eparchy of Canada under the omophorion of Bishop Mitrofan.

Background and history

Serbs arrived in Montreal in the early 20th century.
On 23 February 1954, Bishop Dionisije (Milivojević) appointed hieromonk Justinian (Ilkić) to the Serbian community of Montreal as their parish
priest, the same year he arrived in Canada. Justinian Ilkić was a seminary graduate and former monk of the Monastery of Visoki Dečani in the Serbian province of Kosovo whose abbot was Dionisije himself before he became Bishop (1939) and took over the American-Canadian Diocese in 1940. Father Justinian gathered all Montreal Serbs on 6 February 1954 and formed a Church School Congregregation at a rented Ukrainian Church hall where they elected the first Church Board on 3 March 1954.

With the arrival of V. Rev. Dimitrije Najdanović from Derby in England to Montreal in 1960, things began to change for the better. A year later, the Serbian community of Montreal had a Church, a community center and a priest residence all under the same roof on De Bullion Street. The commissions for the iconostasis were given to a master woodcarver Vladimir Barac and the icon painting to internationally renowned, Belgrade-born artist José Majzner, then residing in Montreal. The consecration date was set for 12 June 1963 but it was postponed on several occasions. Soon the numerous complaints that were filed with the Patriarch of the Serbian Orthodox Church against Dionisije during the years before 1963, came to roost and Dionsisje was called into question as to his fitness to serve as a Bishop and his administration of the Diocese. This action of SOC prompted Dionsije to sever all ties with the Church and begin a series of lawsuits that were only settled after his death.

By avoiding the schism and costly legal battles in the 1960s, the members of the new Montreal Church Council and Dr. Dragutin "Drago" Papić, a renowned Montreal surgeon, as president of the construction committee, were able to raise sufficient funds from the Serbian parishioners to purchase outright a former Presbyterian Church in 1976 along with a rectory in an established and prestigious Montreal neighborhood of Westmount. This was thanks to the doctor's wife Jelena Papić, Ph.D., who first learned that the church was up for sale.

The building
Originally built in 1900 as the Melville Church to the architectural design of Edward Maxwell, the church came with a stately manse next door. Consecration of the new Holy Trinity church was held on The Holy Apostle and Evangelist Luke – 31 October 1976—officiated by Bishop Sava (Vukovich) of the Serbian Orthodox Eparchy of Eastern America
in the year of the Summer Olympic Games in Montreal. Ten years later, the church council launched a building fund for the repairs and reconstruction of the Serbian Community Centre.

See also
Serbian Orthodox Eparchy of Canada
Serbian Canadians

References

Serbian Orthodox Church in Canada
Serbian Orthodox church buildings in Canada
Churches in Montreal
Buildings and structures in Westmount, Quebec
Buildings and structures completed in 1964
20th-century churches in Canada